Boris Koutzen (1 April 1901 – 10 December 1966) was a Russian-American violinist composer and music educator.

Biography
Koutzen was born in Uman, Southern Russia. He began composing at the age of six and studied violin with his father. In 1918 his family moved to Moscow, where Boris entered the Moscow Conservatory to study violin with Lew Moissejewitsch Zeitlin, and composition with Reinhold Glière. That same year, he won the national competition for the position of first violin in the State Opera House Orchestra, and later joined the Moscow Symphony Orchestra under Serge Koussevitzky.

In the fall of 1923 Koutzen came to the United States and became a member of the first violin section of the Philadelphia orchestra under Leopold Stokowski. From 1937 until 1945 he was a member of the NBC Symphony Orchestra under Arturo Toscanini. Mr. Koutzen was head of the violin department of the Philadelphia Conservatory from 1925-1962. In 1944 he joined the faculty of Vassar College, where he taught violin and conducted the Vassar orchestra until 1966.

Selected works
Stage
 You Never Know, Comic Opera in 1 act (1960)

Orchestral
 Valley Forge (1931)
 From the American Folklore, Concert Overture (1943)
 Divertimento (1956)
     Pop Concert
     At the Ballet
     Holiday Mood
 Elegiac Rhapsody (1961)
 Solitude, Poème-nocturne 
 Symphony in C
 Fanfare, Prayer, and March

Band
 Symphonic Rhapsody

Concertante
 Symphonic movement (Mouvement symphonique) for violin and orchestra (1931)
 Concerto for cello, flute, clarinet, bassoon, horn and string orchestra (1934)
 Concert Piece for cello and string orchestra (1946)
 Concerto for viola and orchestra (1949)
 Morning Music for flute and string orchestra (1950)
 Concertino for piano and string orchestra
 Concerto for violin and orchestra

Chamber and instrumental music
 Légende for violin and piano (1928)
 Sonata No. 1 for violin and piano (1928)
 String Quartet No. 1
 Nocturne for violin and piano (1930)
 Duo concertante for violin and piano (1944)
 Music (Serenade) for saxophone, bassoon and cello (1945)
 String Quartet No. 2 (1945)
 Holiday Mood for violin and piano (1948)
 Foundation of Violin Playing (1951)
 Sonata for violin and cello (1952)
 Landscape and Dance for woodwind quintet (1953)
 Pastorale and Dance for violin (or clarinet) and piano (1965)
 Trio for flute, cello and harp (1965)
 Melody with Variations for violin (or clarinet) and piano (1966)
 Music for Violin Alone (1968)
 Sonata No. 2 for violin and piano (1970)
 Piano Trio (1977)
 Poem for violin solo and string quartet 
 Sonata for solo violin

Keyboard
 Enigma for piano (1929)
 Sonatina for piano (1931)
 Fervent Is My Longing, Choral Prelude for organ (1935)
 Eidólons, Poem for piano (1953)
 Clown's Reverie and Dance for piano (1958)
 Sonnet for Organ (1965)
  Sonatina for 2 pianos (1944)

Choral
 An Invocation for women's voices and orchestra (or piano) (1958); words by John Addington Symonds
 Concerto for chorus and orchestra
 The Fatal Oath

References
 Library of Congress biography (public domain source)

External links

 

1901 births
1966 deaths
American classical violinists
Male classical violinists
American male violinists
American male composers
Russian classical violinists
Russian composers
Russian male composers
Soviet emigrants to the United States
Vassar College faculty
People from Mount Pleasant, New York
American people of Russian descent
20th-century classical violinists
20th-century American composers
20th-century American male musicians
Emigrants from the Russian Empire to the United States
20th-century American violinists